is a Japanese stage play and anime series, part of a wider franchise titled The Fool by anime creator Shōji Kawamori. The play is a combination of live actors produced by Avex Live Creative and animation by Satelight, first performed on December 8, 2013. The anime series is also animated by Satelight and began airing on January 5, 2014 and ended on June 22, 2014.

Plot

Once upon a time, there was the Western Planet and the Eastern Planet. The two sides were bound by the "Dragon Pulse" spanning the heavens. The civilization that once had prospered has now turned to a tale of dreams, as the inextinguishable flames of war tear the realm asunder. The two planets remain engulfed in endless battles. The return of the super technology known as "sacred treasures" could revolutionize the world order, but no one knows of them but one person—a "heretical girl." A girl from the Western Planet, Jeanne Kaguya d'Arc, saw heavenly visions of the birth of a "Savior-King" who will save the world. She embarks on a journey to the Eastern Planet with Leonardo da Vinci, "the one who observes the world." They come across the heretic of the Eastern Planet and "the greatest fool of the day," Oda Nobunaga.

Characters

Main characters

The main character and a member of the Oda clan in the Eastern Planet. He is usually taken as a fool for his brash and impulsive behavior, thus both his father and the court claim that his brother Nobukatsu would be a better successor to his father. He obtains a powerful Giant War Armor mech from Leonardo who he names "The Fool", in homage to his fame. He is prophesied by Jeanne to be the Savior-King that will unite both the Western and Eastern Planets. 
He chooses to become the Destroyer-King and faces and is killed by his friend Akechi Mitsuhide, but against all prognostic, what he destroys isn't the creation itself, but the power of destruction instead, and becomes the avatar of chaos. Before dying, he declares his love for Jeanne, and vow to encounter each other in their next lives.

Guided by visions of an ominous future for the Western Planet, she meets Leonardo and joins him in his journey to the Eastern Planet where she meets Nobunaga and disguises herself as a man called Ranmaru to fight by his side. She possesses a regalia, a powerful amulet that can empower a Giant War Armor. She frequently has doubts as to Nobunaga being the Savior-King, claiming she will never understand him. Eventually she receives her own Giant War Armor, named Orléans, from Da Vinci.
She appears to be developing slight feelings for Nobunaga, as evidenced by her jealousy during the betrothal ceremony between Nobunaga and Himiko. She admitted her love for him later on while conversing with Himiko. She's fatally injured during the final fight, and remains with Nobunaga, even after he becomes the Destroyer-King, until both die, while declaring their love for each other and vowing to meet in their next lives.

One of Nobunaga's retainers. Extremely calm and collected, Mitsuhide is Nobunaga's chief political advisor and the master of the Oda Clan's shinobi forces. A kind man despite his quiet demeanor, he reluctantly assassinated Nobukatsu in order to ensure that Nobunaga succeeds the clan. He seems to have feelings for Ichihime, evidenced by the fact that he felt shocked when Caesar proposed to her.
He's brainwashed by King Arthur, and comes to believe that Nobunaga is the Destroyer-King and tries to kill him in order to save the world. After Arthur is killed, he chooses his own path and kills Nobunaga, while realizing that he is the true Savior-King and vows to Nobunaga and Jeanne that he will create a world of peace.

Another of Nobunaga's retainers. He is hyperactive and vulgar, which earned him the nickname "monkey". He has shown to be proficient with machinery and is capable of great acrobatic feats, implying training in the shinobi arts. He eventually steals his own Giant War Armor from the Western Plant, which he named Goku, and is given the Wind Regalia by Nobunaga. After being nearly killed by Alexander, he's saved by Himiko and her powers, now he is part cyborg. He is the only person that knows that Mitsuhide killed Nobukatsu, after being told by the former.

A genius inventor from the West, he is the one who builds "The Fool" and entrusts it to Nobunaga. He usually provides guidance to others by making divinations with his tarot deck. He came to Jeanne in her village and travels with her to find out the meaning behind her visions and to find the "truth" of the world.
After ending his painting The Last Supper, he dies after finally understanding the truth of the world, while letting all his tarot cards fly away.

Eastern Planet

Oda Clan

Nobunaga's younger sister. She bears a calm demeanor and beauty that catches the attention of Caesar. She loves her brother dearly and claims that most people cannot see his true greatness. She accepts Caesar proposal of becoming his queen in exchange of ensuring the truce between the armies, but assures him that if he doesn't keeps his promise of protecting the Oda people, she will kill him herself, even at the cost of her own life. She seems to reciprocate the feelings Mitsuhide has for her. She tragically dies at the hands of Nell and Bianchi when they betray Caesar and she holds him as he dies, shortly after she succumbs to her wounds, bringing despair to Nobunaga and Mitsuhide.

Nobunaga's father and leader of the Oda clan. He is later killed by Caesar during the Takeda Clan's assault on the Oda castle.

Nobunaga's younger brother. The advisers of the court, as well as his father, believe him to be the better choice for succeeding the Oda clan. He believes in his brother and says that he would be a better ruler. He decides to succeed his father and to later step aside for his brother when he is ready. He is later killed by Mitsuhide, who believes that the advisers would never let him step down after he succeeds.

Other characters

The queen of Yamatai, she holds a longtime crush for Nobunaga and entrusts him her regalia in exchange of becoming his bride. She later stands in harm's way to save Nobunaga from an assassin sent to kill him, although she manages to survive. She would continue to provide Nobunaga with great political support and allowed him to use her flying airship as his personal transport.
Her condition for using her regalia and the power of the Ley Lines weakens her body to the point she becomes terminally ill, with only Da Vinci and Hideyoshi knowing the truth. When her condition reaches its final state, Hideyoshi tells the truth to Nobunaga in an attempt to save her. She uses her airship Azuchi one final time to help Nobunaga and Jeanne reach the palace of King Arthur. She finally succumbs to her illness, but accepts the love between Nobunaga and Jeanne while dying in Nobunaga's arms.

Leader of the Takeda clan. Shingen is a proud and noble warrior who set his sights on Nobunaga the moment he heard the boy had gained a Saint War Armor. He values honor and despises backhanded means such as assassination. His Giant War Armor, Fuurin Kazan, is enhanced greatly by the two Regalia in his possession, the Regalia of Wind and Fire. Following his loss to Nobunaga and death at Caesar's hands, Shingen passed on his regalia to Nobunaga.

Leader of the Uesugi Clan and ruler of the country of Echigo. He was Shingen's greatest rival before his death and Kenshin greatly respected him. He is shown to be an extremely cordial and polite individual even when speaking to her enemies. However, underneath his calm mask lurks a man who greatly enjoys conflict and he secretly does what he can to prevent peace from settling on the Eastern Planet. His Giant War Armor, Visra is capable of defeating other Giant War Armors with ease, even those using a regalia, despite not using his own. After being defeated by Alexander, he desires to become stronger and accompanies Nobunaga in his quest to face the Star Dragons, going missing in the process. He returns to help Hideyoshi battle Alexander, after losing one eye, finally accepting his own weaknesses.

Three sisters who serve as kunoichi in the Oda Clan's shinobi forces under the supervision of Akechi Mitsuhide. They were assigned mainly to protect and serve Ichihime until her death.
They are based on Oda Nobunaga's nieces.

Western Planet

The ruler of the Western Planet who has just united all of it under his rule. Despite being wrapped in mystery, with an unknown origin and intentions, he has proven to be a charismatic leader as his commanders are extremely loyal to him. Some, such as Caesar, consider him the True Savior-King. He seems to be capable of changing his face to appear whatever that person wants, in order to make them blindly loyal to him.
He reveals his true face to Nobunaga, and when he tries to summon the Holy Grail, he's finally killed during the fight between Nobunaga and Alexander while being crushed by the avatars of the Star Dragons.

Round Table

A masked man charged with dealing with the escaped Leonardo da Vinci. He pilots a Giant War Armor named Quo Vadis. He decides that he wants to have Ichihime for himself when he sees her while scouting out the Oda castle.
During the Takeda Clan's assault on the Oda Clan's castle, he appears and kills Nobuhide. He later kills Shingen with a surprise attack from behind before he can pass his wind regalia on to Nobunaga (which his subordinates Nell and Bianchi then steal), then proceeds to incite the Takeda Clan by claiming that Nobunaga was the one to stab Shingen from behind.
When he accepted a truce from the Oda Clan and a temporary alliance, he put the condition that Ichihime will become his queen in return for the peace between the factions. He seems to have a rivalry with Alexander. While he doesn't consider dishonorable to attack someone from behind, he claims to dislike killing women.
He's brainwashed by King Arthur and tries to fulfill his wishes, until he is freed of his influence by Nobunaga. He is betrayed by Nell and Bianchi and is pierced by a spear that kills him, Ichihime and Nell, although he kills Bianchi in retaliation before succumbing to his wounds, and dies in the arms of Ichihime claiming his happiest moments were with her.

The strongest member of the Round Table, and Arthur's apparent second in command. His comrades hold his skills in high regard and greatly value his opinion. His Giant War Armor, Gaia, is by far the most powerful seen so far, easily defeating Kenshin, Nobunaga and nearly killing Hideyoshi. Da Vinci assures that if it wasn't for King Arthur, he would have become the emperor of the Star of the West himself.

Although he accompanies Charlemagne and Hannibal in their mission to the Eastern Planet, Borgia chooses to remain in the ship while they fight. He stabs Hannibal in the back when she planned torturing the captive Jeanne. A sadistic person who has a loathing towards Machiavelli. He betrays Caesar and helps Nell and Bianchi in killing him. He later shoots Jeanne once he believes she has fulfilled her purpose and is shot and killed by Mitsuhide in return.

A blonde man who acts as Hannibal's partner. He wields a regalia of wind that, in combination with Hannibal's water regalia, creates powerful ice attacks. He uses this skill to freeze the people of Owari so that they may serve as hostages, only to kill them all when Hannibal commanded him to "release" them. He is fatally injured by Uesugi Kenshin; however, before dying, he uses his remaining strength to send the defeated Hannibal and captured Jeanne towards the Western fleet.

 A tall woman who wears a rather flamboyant dress. She appears to be the cruelest member of the Round Table as she would make repeated requests to have Caesar punished for his failures on the Eastern Planet. She is quite arrogant, often boasting that she could do a better job. It is possible that there might be some bad blood between them. She wields the regalia of water. After a failed attempt to acquire Nobunaga's regalia, she returns with the unconscious Jeanne Kaguya d'Arc and the deceased Charlemagne's wind regalia. As she plots to torture her captive, she is stabbed and killed by Cesare Borgia.

A woman with purple hair that hides her right eye because its mechanical. She seems to dislike Borgia and unlike him, she prefers using a more psychological type of torture. She claims her biggest desire is being recognized by King Arthur, and wants Jeanne's powers to achieve it. She was later killed by Borgia.

He accompanies Alexander in their quest to conquer the Star of the East, showing his ruthlessness by destroying the Takeda lands. Unlike most characters, his Giant War Armor is shaped similar to that of an elephant. He was killed by Uesugi Kenshin.

Other characters

An admiral from the Western Planet who escorts Leonardo da Vinci and Jeanne d'Arc to the Eastern Planet until they escape his ship. He would later escort Caesar on his own voyage to the Eastern Planet as well.

 Caesar's lieutenant. He is shown to be extremely loyal to his commander and follows his orders without question. Originally left behind on the Western Planet, he personally escorted a shipment of Giant War Armors to the Eastern Planet. One of these machines was stolen by Hideyoshi, who defeated Brutus with the power of the Wind Regalia.

A mysterious and blood thirsty little boy who accompanied Caesar to the Western Planet. He is shown to take joy out of others discomfort and apparently spies on Caesar for King Arthur. When Arthur orders him and Nell to kill Caesar, he attacks him and before he can react, he's pierced by the spear thrown by his sister, dying alongside Caesar and Ichihime.

Bianchi's apparent twin sister. Her personality is exactly like that of her brother and she also spies on Caesar for King Arthur. When Arthur orders her and Bianchi to kill Caesar, she throws the spear that kills Bianchi, Caesar and Ichihime, before being killed in retaliation by Caesar. She and her brother seem to show relief as they die despite the pain, as the sinister red glow of their eyes fades presumably along with whatever spell they were under.

Media

Anime
An anime television series by Satelight aired from January 5, 2014 to June 22, 2014. For episodes 1-13, the opening theme for is "Fool the World" by Minori Chihara, and the ending theme is "Axis" by Stereo Dive Foundation. Anime streaming site Crunchyroll acquired the streaming rights for North America and other territories. Sentai Filmworks has licensed the series for digital and home video release in North America.

Episode list

References

External links
 
 
 

2013 plays
Action anime and manga
Cultural depictions of Alexander the Great
Cultural depictions of Cesare Borgia
Cultural depictions of Charlemagne
Cultural depictions of Hannibal
Cultural depictions of Joan of Arc
Depictions of Julius Caesar in plays
Cultural depictions of Leonardo da Vinci
Cultural depictions of Niccolò Machiavelli
Cultural depictions of Oda Nobunaga
Japanese plays
Mecha anime and manga
Satelight
Sentai Filmworks